Phacusa inermis is a moth of the family Zygaenidae. It was described by Alberti in 1954. It is found in China.

References

Moths described in 1954
Procridinae